The 1991 French Grand Prix was a Formula One motor race held at Magny-Cours on 7 July 1991. It was the seventh race of the 1991 Formula One World Championship, and the first French Grand Prix to be held at Magny-Cours. The 72-lap race was won by Nigel Mansell, driving a Williams-Renault, with local driver Alain Prost second in a Ferrari and Ayrton Senna third in a McLaren-Honda.

Pre-race
The French Grand Prix had moved from the Circuit Paul Ricard near Marseille to the Circuit de Nevers Magny-Cours in the centre of France, to mixed reviews. There were no changes in the driver line-up, but the Footwork team had decided to abandon the disastrous Porsche V12 engine project in favour of a return to Ford engines, while Ferrari introduced a new car, the 643.

Qualifying

Pre-qualifying report
In the Friday morning pre-qualification session, Andrea de Cesaris was fastest in the Jordan for the second time this season. He was four tenths of a second faster than JJ Lehto in the Dallara, with Olivier Grouillard third fastest for Fondmetal at his home race, the second time in a row the Frenchman had pre-qualified. The fourth pre-qualifier was Bertrand Gachot in the other Jordan.

Those failing to progress to the main qualifying sessions included the other Dallara of Emanuele Pirro in fifth, just a couple of tenths slower than Gachot. The two Modena Lambos were sixth and seventh, with Nicola Larini outpacing Eric van de Poele, and bottom of the time sheets was Pedro Chaves in the Coloni. This was the seventh consecutive Grand Prix in which the Portuguese driver had failed to pre-qualify.

Pre-qualifying classification

Qualifying report
In qualifying, local driver Alain Prost impressed and was set to score Ferrari's first pole position of the season, but in the dying minutes Riccardo Patrese in the Williams-Renault came through to pip the French driver to the pole. Championship leader Ayrton Senna spun on Olivier Grouillard's oil on his final qualifying attempt and had to settle for third alongside Nigel Mansell in the second Williams, with the rest of the top ten starting spots occupied by Gerhard Berger, Jean Alesi, Nelson Piquet, Roberto Moreno, Maurício Gugelmin, and the impressive Gianni Morbidelli in a Minardi.

Qualifying classification

Race

Race report
At the start Patrese made a disastrous start and dropped to 10th position on lap 1, so Prost led from Mansell, Senna, Berger, and Alesi, while Bertrand Gachot spun off on the first lap in his Jordan. Berger was the first of the big boys to go out when his engine failed on lap 6, his third consecutive retirement due to engine problems. Patrese started another recovery drive by passing both Piquet and Morbidelli in one fell swoop when Morbidelli botched an overtaking attempt, taking himself out of the running. At the front Mansell pressured Prost and on Lap 21 he made his move taking advantage of traffic to out-brake the French star going into the hairpin. Mansell slowly pulled away but problems at his first tyre stop dropped him back behind Prost. Mansell once again closed on Prost and the two battled it out until Mansell finally managed to take advantage of traffic, again, and took the lead on Lap 54 by this time outbraking Prost around the outside at the hairpin. Mansell pulled away and scored his first win of the season, Prost was second followed by Senna, Alesi, Patrese, and de Cesaris.

This was the 17th win of Mansell's career, thus breaking the record of Grand Prix wins by an English driver, previously held by Stirling Moss.

Race classification

Championship standings after the race

Drivers' Championship standings

Constructors' Championship standings

References

French Grand Prix
Grand Prix
French Grand Prix